Rhodopentas is a genus of flowering plants belonging to the family Rubiaceae.

Its native range is Southern Ethiopia to Southern Tropical Africa.

Species:

Rhodopentas bussei 
Rhodopentas parvifolia

References

Rubiaceae
Rubiaceae genera
Taxa named by Birgitta Bremer